René Métain (22 May 1903 – 23 November 1984) was a German film editor. He was born in Potsdam into a family of French origin. His elder brother was the cinematographer Charles Métain. He edited twenty two films during his career including the 1938 comedy Napoleon Is to Blame for Everything.

Selected filmography
 Danton (1931)
 Bobby Gets Going (1931)
 The Empress and I (1933)
 The Only Girl (1933)
 So Ended a Great Love (1934)
 Fruit in the Neighbour's Garden (1935)
 Pygmalion (1935)
 Three Girls for Schubert (1936)
 The Cabbie's Song (1936)
 The Emperor's Candlesticks (1936)
 Darling of the Sailors (1937)
 Dangerous Game (1937)
 Napoleon Is to Blame for Everything (1938)
 The Man Who Couldn't Say No (1938)
 Wibbel the Tailor (1939)
 Hotel Sacher (1939)
 We Danced Around the World (1939)
 The Golden Spider (1943)

References

Bibliography

External links 
 

1903 births
1984 deaths
German film editors
People from Potsdam
Film people from Brandenburg